Ville Ahlgren (born October 6, 1993) is a Finnish ice hockey player. His is currently playing with Ässät in the Finnish Liiga.

Ahlgren made his Liiga debut playing with Ässät during the 2013–14 Liiga season.

References

External links

1993 births
Living people
Ässät players
Finnish ice hockey forwards
Sportspeople from Pori